Leonard Hector Allum (16 July 1907 – 15 May 1980) was an English footballer who played as a centre-back.

Club career
Allum played as a defender for Chelsea, amassing 93 league appearances, with two goals.

References

1907 births
1980 deaths
Sportspeople from Reading, Berkshire
English footballers
Association football defenders
Fulham F.C. players
Reading F.C. players
Maidenhead United F.C. players
Chelsea F.C. players
Leyton Orient F.C. players